Elections to the Supreme Soviet of the RSFSR were held on 24 February 1985, along with elections to Soviets in the rest of the Republics of the USSR.

The official turnout was 99.97%. 975 people were elected, all from the Bloc of Communists and Non-Partisans

100% of voters in their constituency voted for the General Secretary of the Central Committee of the CPSU Konstantin Chernenko. Chernenko died two weeks later.

References

Russia
Legislative elections in Russia
Supreme Soviet of Russia